The Communauté de communes de la Porte des Vosges Méridionales is an administrative association of rural communes in the Vosges department of eastern France. It was created on 1 January 2017 by the merger of the former Communauté de communes de la Porte des Hautes-Vosges, Communauté de communes des Vosges Méridionales and the commune Saint-Amé. It consists of 10 communes, and has its administrative offices at Saint-Étienne-lès-Remiremont. Its area is 262.8 km2, and its population was 29,262 in 2019.

Composition
The communauté de communes consists of the following 10 communes:

Dommartin-lès-Remiremont
Éloyes
Girmont-Val-d'Ajol
Le Val-d'Ajol
Plombières-les-Bains
Remiremont
Saint-Amé
Saint-Étienne-lès-Remiremont
Saint-Nabord
Vecoux

References

Porte des Vosges Méridionales
Porte des Vosges Méridionales